Junta ( or ) is a Spanish, Portuguese and Italian term for a civil deliberative or administrative council. In English, the term, even when used alone, generally refers to a "military junta", the government of an authoritarian state run by high-ranking officers of a military.

In Italy, a giunta is the civil executive of regions (see Regions of Italy#Institutions) and of municipalities (comune, see Comune#Importance and function). In Spain, the term refers to various historical and current governing institutions of a particular territory or occasion.

An earlier, different use of the word in English was the Whig Junto, a political faction in early 18th-century Britain.

The term is not related to the Sanskrit word Janatā (also transliterated as Jantā and Juntā), which refers to the public/people/masses.

Historical examples 
 Junta (Habsburg)
 Specific to Spain:
 Name of some of the institutions of government of the autonomous communities of Spain (Regional Government of Andalusia and Junta of Castile and León) or the parliament of the Principality of Asturias (General Junta of the Principality of Asturias)
 Junta (Peninsular War), 1808–1810
 Junta acting as jury in Valladolid debate, 1550s
 Argentina:
 Primera Junta, 1810
 Junta Grande, 1810s
 National Reorganization Process, 1970's
 Chile in the 1810s:
 List of Government Juntas of Chile
 Portugal:
 National Salvation Junta, ruled 1974−1975, after the Carnation Revolution
 Junta de freguesia, the executive body of a freguesia (civil parish)
 Other organisations:
 Junta de Investigación de Accidentes de Aviación Civil, the Argentinian civil aviation accident investigation agency
 Revolutionary Government Junta, three consecutive Salvadoran joint civilian-military dictatorships
 Junta Investigadora de Accidentes de Aviación Civil, the former Venezuelan civil aviation accident investigation agency
 Junta de Aviación Civil, the Dominican Republic civil aviation authority
 Junta de Administración Portuaria y de Desarrollo Económico de la Vertiente Atlántica de Costa Rica, the Costa Rican Board of Port Administration and Economic Development of the Atlantic Coast
 Junta (trade unionism), a group of leading British trade unionists in the 1860s

See also
 Military dictatorship
 Coup d'état

References

Broad-concept articles
Authoritarianism
Spanish words and phrases
Portuguese words and phrases